The Karelian Front ) was a front (a formation of Army Group size) of the Soviet Union's Red Army during World War II, and operated in Karelia.

Wartime 
The Karelian Front was created in August 1941 when Northern Front was split into Karelian Front and Leningrad Front to take account of the different military developments and requirements on the Leningrad approaches versus those along the Finnish border to the Arctic. It remained in existence until the end of the war.

The front covered the sector north of Lake Ladoga and the Svir River to the Arctic Coast near Murmansk. It was involved in combat with both Finnish and German forces along the Soviet-Finnish border. The front between Lake Ladoga and Lake Onega was split off to the independent 7th Army during the static phase of the war.

During 1944, the Karelian Front participated with the Leningrad Front in the final offensive against Finland which led to the Soviet-Finnish armistice. In October 1944 the Petsamo-Kirkenes Operation was conducted along the front, capturing some parts of northern Finland and liberating the easternmost parts of the Norwegian Finnmark province from German occupation.

The Karelian Front in the Petsamo-Kirkenes Operation conducted the only successful major military operation ever undertaken in an Arctic environment in modern warfare.  The experiences in the conduct of the operation, particularly in terms of organising rear-area services and supply, were considered important to the conduct of the Red Army’s offensive against the Japanese Kwantung Army in Manchuria, and many leading officers were transferred from Karelian Front to the Baikal theatre of war.

Order of battle 
Order of battle of the Karelian Front on 1 September 1944:
 7th Army (Alexey Nikolayevich Krutikov)
4th Rifle Corps (4 ск) (114th, 272nd Rifle Divisions)
99th Rifle Corps (18th, 65th, 310th Rifle Divisions)
30th, 32nd Ski Brigades
150th, 162nd Fortified Areas
149th, 633rd, 1942nd Corps Artillery Regiment
989th Howitzer Artillery Regiment
 14th Army (Vladimir Shcherbakov)
126th Light Mountain Rifle Corps (72nd Naval Rifle Brigade, 31st Ski Brigade))
10th Guards Rifle Division
14th Rifle Division (Soviet Union)
2nd Fortified Region
 19th Army (Georgy Kozlov)
21st Rifle Division
67th Rifle Division
104th Rifle Division
122nd Rifle Division
341st Rifle Division
38th Guards Tank Brigade
73rd Guards Separate Tank Regiment
88th Separate Tank Regiment
 26th Army (Lev Skvirsky)
31st Rifle Corps (83rd, 205th Rifle Divisions)
132nd Rifle Corps (54th, 367th Rifle Divisions)
45th Rifle Division
 32nd Army (Filipp D. Gorelenko)
127th Light Mountain Rifle Corps (127 лгск) (27th Rifle Division)
HQ 131st Rifle Corps
 176th Rifle Division
 289th Rifle Division
 313th Rifle Division
 368th Rifle Division
 3rd Naval Infantry Brigade
 69th, 70th Naval Rifle Brigades
 33rd Ski Brigade
 31st Separate Naval Infantry Battalion
7th Air Army (Ivan Sokolov)
1st Guards Mixed Aviation Division
257th, 260th, 261st Mixed Aviation Divisions
324th Fighter Aviation Division
858th Fighter Aviation Regiment
204th Fire Correction and Reconnaissance Aviation Regiment
121st Separate Communications Aviation Regiment
108th Reconnaissance Aviation Squadron
119th Reconnaissance Aviation Squadron
118th Long-Range Reconnaissance Aviation Squadron

Major operations
 Svir-Petrozavodsk Operation against Finland, July–August 1944
 Petsamo-Kirkenes Operation against the Wehrmacht, October 1944

Commanders 
 Colonel-General Valerian Frolov (September 1941 – February 1944)
 Marshal of the Soviet Union (as of October 1944) K. A. Meretskov  (February 1944 – May 1945)

Notes

References 
 Meretskov 'Im Dienste des Volkes'
 Khudalov 'Am Rande des Kontinents'
 Combined Arms Research Library, The Petsamo-Kirkenes Operation – Leavenworth Paper No. 17

See also
6th SS Mountain Division Nord

Soviet fronts